The Nevinnomyssk Canal (Nevinnomysskij kanal) is an irrigation canal in Stavropol Krai in Russia. It leads water from the Kuban River to the Yegorlyk River, which in turn drains north to the Manych River. The canal starts at a dam across the Kuban River at the town of Nevinnomyssk.

Construction work on the canal started in 1936, but was interrupted by World War II. Work resumed in 1944, and in 1948 the Nevinnomyssk Canal was put into service. Along the canal there are two hydroelectric powerstations – Svistukhinskaya and Sengileyevskaya.

See also 
Great Stavropol Canal

Canals in Russia
Buildings and structures in Stavropol Krai
Canals opened in 1948
Transport in Stavropol Krai